The women's 50 metre rifle three positions competition at the 2000 Summer Olympics was held on 20 September. The qualification round, consisting of 20 shots from each position, was fired between 09:00 and 11:30 Australian Eastern Standard Time (UTC+10), and the final round of 10 additional shots standing at 12:15.

Records
The existing World and Olympic records were as follows.

Qualification round

Q Qualified for final

Final

References

Sources

Shooting at the 2000 Summer Olympics
Olymp
Women's events at the 2000 Summer Olympics
Women's 050m 3 positions 2000